The Gilded Highway is a lost 1926 American silent drama film directed by J. Stuart Blackton and starring Dorothy Devore, John Harron and Macklyn Arbuckle.

Cast
 Dorothy Devore as Primrose Welby  
 John Harron as Jack Welby  
 Macklyn Arbuckle as Jonathan Welby  
 Myrna Loy as Inez Quartz  
 Florence Turner as Mrs. Welby  
 Sheldon Lewis as Uncle Nicholas Welby  
 Andrée Tourneur as Amabel  
 Gardner James as Hugo Blythe 
 Mathilde Comont as Sarah  
 Thomas R. Mills as Adolphus Faring

References

External links
 
 

1926 films
1926 drama films
1926 lost films
1920s English-language films
American silent feature films
Silent American drama films
Films directed by J. Stuart Blackton
Warner Bros. films
American black-and-white films
Lost American films
Lost drama films
1920s American films